Thomas Prufer (1929–1993) was an American philosopher who taught at the Catholic University of America from 1960 to 1993. While his work is little-known, some academics have praised his collection Recapitulations: Essays in Philosophy (1993), which gathers his life's work.

James Hart of Indiana University claimed in 2007:
He was long and thin, with a deep sonorous voice and penetrating eyes. His lectures became the most exalted philosophical experiences of my life. I later as a professor strove to emulate him but I never got near what he accomplished in the classroom. Prufer’s published writings are packed with deep philosophical insights and analyses written in an incomparably concise and poetic prose. Besides his dissertation, his only published book, Recapitulations: Essays in Philosophy, is only about 100 pages. Yet in substance it is worth numerous volumes, and I recommend it to the world.

Virtually all of the content of Recapitulations had been published previously. Frederick J. Crosson argued of the collection, "Most of [the essays] are brief: dense because condensed, shipped to essentials. They demand attentive reading, but they repay it."

References

External links 
 "The Death of Charm and the Advent of Grace: Waugh's Brideshead Revisited" (Fall 1983)

1929 births
1993 deaths
20th-century American philosophers
Continental philosophers